Oscar Carl Linnér (born 23 February 1997) is a Swedish professional footballer who plays as a goalkeeper for Allsvenskan club IF Brommapojkarna. He has represented the Sweden national team.

Club career

AIK
Linnér made his debut for AIK in a UEFA Europa League qualifier match against VPS.

Arminia Bielefeld
On 7 January 2020, Linnér joined Arminia Bielefeld on a three-and-a-half year deal.

Loan to Brescia 
On 11 August 2021, Linnér joined Serie B club Brescia on a season-long loan deal, with an option to buy.

Loan to Sundsvall 
On 6 February 2022, Linnér was loaned to Sundsvall. However, he left the club after only two months. On 24 August 2022, Linnér's contract with Arminia was dissolved.

AaB
With first goalkeeper Josip Posavec injured, Danish Superliga club AaB confirmed on 16 October that they had signed Linnér to a short contract for the remainder of 2022.

International career
He made his debut for the Sweden national football team on 11 January 2019 in a friendly against Iceland, as a starter.

Personal life
Oscar Linnér has a two-years-younger brother, Albin Linnér, who is also professional footballer.

Career statistics

Honours
AIK
 Allsvenskan: 2018

References

External links
 
 
 

Living people
1997 births
Swedish footballers
Swedish expatriate footballers
People from Danderyd Municipality
Association football goalkeepers
Sportspeople from Stockholm County
Sweden youth international footballers
Sweden under-21 international footballers
Sweden international footballers
AIK Fotboll players
Arminia Bielefeld players
Brescia Calcio players
AaB Fodbold players
GIF Sundsvall players
IF Brommapojkarna players
Allsvenskan players
Bundesliga players
2. Bundesliga players
Serie B players
Danish Superliga players
Swedish expatriate sportspeople in Germany
Swedish expatriate sportspeople in Italy
Swedish expatriate sportspeople in Denmark
Expatriate footballers in Germany
Expatriate footballers in Italy
Expatriate men's footballers in Denmark